Jack Harrison Cirilo Silva (born 26 January 1999) is a Peruvian footballer who plays as a right winger for Ecosem Pasco.

Club career

Early years
Cirilo began playing football when he was 6 years old, when his father took him out to play with the kids from his neighborhood. His big talent was quickly discovered and he began playing for the local club Unión Huaral. After a trial in October 2013, he moved to Alianza Lima the age of 13.

Alianza Lima
Cirilo played in the Alianza Lima's youth rank's for several years, before he was promoted to the reserve team where he quickly became an important player and the captain. In January 2019, he joined Peruvian Primera División side Ayacucho FC on loan until the end of the year. He scored his first official goal in his second appearance for the team. However, he only made a total of for appearances and was mostly used for the reserve team, where he became the captain and scored 15 goals in the 2019 season.

Cirilo returned to Alianza for the 2020 season.

Later years
On 15 September 2020 it was confirmed, that Cirilo had left Alianza to join Peruvian Segunda División side Santos de Nasca. He left the club at the end of 2021. In July 2022, Cirilo returned to his former club, Unión Huaral. In September 2022, he moved to Ecosem Pasco.

References

External links
 
 

Living people
1999 births
Association football wingers
Peruvian footballers
Peruvian Primera División players
Unión Huaral footballers
Club Alianza Lima footballers
Ayacucho FC footballers
Santos de Nasca players